The Miho Museum is located southeast of Kyoto, Japan, in the Shigaraki neighborhood of the city of  Kōka, in Shiga Prefecture. It is also the headquarters of the Shinji Shumeikai, a new religious group founded by Mihoko Koyama.

History 
The museum was the dream of Mihoko Koyama (after whom it is named), founder of the religious organization Shinji Shumeikai which is now said to have some 300,000 members worldwide. Furthermore, in the 1990s Koyama commissioned the museum to be built close to the Shumei temple in the Shiga mountains.

Collection
The Miho Museum houses Mihoko Koyama's private collection of Asian and Western antiques bought on the world market by the Shumei organisation in the years before the museum was opened in 1997. While Koyama began acquiring stoneware tea ceremony vessels as early as the 1950s, the bulk of the museum's acquisitions were made in the 1990s. There are over two thousand pieces in the permanent collection, of which approximately 250 are displayed at any one time. Among the objects in the collection are more than 1,200 objects that appear to have been produced in Achaemenid Central Asia. Some scholars have claimed these objects are part of the Oxus Treasure, lost shortly after its discovery in 1877 and rediscovered in Afghanistan in 1993. The presence of a unique findspot for both the Miho acquisitions and the British Museum's material, however, has been challenged.

Many of the items in the collection were acquired in collaboration with the art dealer Noriyoshi Horiuchi over the course of just six years, and some have little or no known provenance. In 2001 the museum acknowledged that a sixth-century statue of a Boddhisatva in its collection was the same sculpture which been stolen from a public garden in Shandong province, China, in 1994, agreeing with the Chinese government to return it in 2007.

Highlights of the collections have been featured in traveling exhibitions at the Los Angeles County Museum of Art and the Metropolitan Museum of Art in 1996, as well as the Kunshistorisches Museum Wien in 1999.

Architecture

Mihoko Koyama and her daughter, Hiroko Koyama, commissioned the American architect I. M. Pei to design the Miho Museum. Pei's design, which he came to call Shangri-La, is executed in a hilly and forested landscape.  Approximately three-quarters of the 17,400 square meter building is situated underground, carved out of a rocky mountaintop. The roof is a large glass and steel construction, while the exterior and interior walls and floor are made of a warm beige-colored limestone from France – the same material used by Pei in the reception hall of the Louvre. The structural engineer for this project was Leslie E. Robertson Associates.

Pei continued to make changes to the design of the galleries during construction as new pieces were acquired for the collection.

Pei had earlier designed the bell tower at Misono, the international headquarters and spiritual center of the Shumei organization. The bell tower can be seen from the windows of the museum.

See also
 Antiquities trade

Notes

External links

Miho Museum
Shumei

Art museums and galleries in Japan
Museums in Shiga Prefecture
History museums in Japan
I. M. Pei buildings
Art museums established in 1997
1997 establishments in Japan
Museums of Ancient Near East in Asia
Egyptological collections
Former private collections
Kōka, Shiga